Gorisa is a village in the Sachkhere Municipality of Imereti in western Georgia. It is the birthplace of Giorgi Tsereteli, a Georgian writer of the 19th century, and his son, Irakli Tsereteli, a leading Georgian Menshevik.

References
 Georgian Soviet Encyclopedia Vol. 3, p. 226, 1978. 

Geography of Georgia (country)
Populated places in Sachkhere Municipality